The Firstside Historic District is a historic district in downtown Pittsburgh, Pennsylvania, United States.  The district was listed on the National Register of Historic Places on July 28, 1988, and its boundaries were expanded on May 8, 2013.

References

Historic districts on the National Register of Historic Places in Pennsylvania
Historic districts in Pittsburgh
Pittsburgh History & Landmarks Foundation Historic Landmarks
National Register of Historic Places in Pittsburgh